The Sir John A. Macdonald Building is a former bank building in Ottawa now owned by the federal government of Canada.  It is located at 144 Wellington Street, at the corner of O'Connor Street, with a third frontage on Sparks Street, just in front of West Block of Parliament. Its façade indicates its former heritage as a Bank of Montreal branch location.

It is an example of Beaux-Arts architecture. Designed by E.I. Barott, it was built in 1930. It reflects the integration of several styles including classical elements that had long been used to design Canadian banks. The Doric columns or the classical structure are flattened. Rather than classical figures the exterior of the building is carved with scenes depicting Canadian industry and architecture. As the building is on a slope the Sparks Street entrance is a storey below the Wellington Street one. This below grade section is made of granite, while the upper level is of limestone.

The Government of Canada ordered the Bank of Montreal to vacate the building before May 2005. The Bank of Montreal was the last commercial building on this downtown street, just in front of the Parliament buildings.  Now all buildings on Wellington Street between Elgin Street and the Ottawa River Parkway are Federal Government property.

On 11 Jan 2012, the building was renamed the Sir John A. Macdonald Building.

As of 2015, the building is used for parliamentary business and reception functions.

References

Kalman, Harold D. A History of Canadian Architecture. Toronto: Oxford University Press, 1994.

Bank of Montreal
Beaux-Arts architecture in Canada
Art Deco architecture in Canada
Commercial buildings completed in 1930
Historic bank buildings in Canada
Parliament of Canada buildings
John A. Macdonald